Koerner, Ray & Glover was a loose-knit group of three blues musicians from Minneapolis, Minnesota: "Spider" John Koerner on guitar and vocals, Dave "Snaker" Ray on guitar and vocals, and Tony "Little Sun" Glover on harmonica. They were notable figures of the revival of folk music and blues in the 1960s.

History
Koerner, Ray and Glover, three White Americans, met in the folk music scene around the University of Minnesota, when Koerner and Ray were students. Their common interest in folk music and blues led them to record and perform in various configurations, in solo turns and duets, but rarely as a trio. Ray suggested that it would be more accurate to refer to them as "Koerner and/or Ray and/or Glover". Their first album, Blues, Rags and Hollers, was released in 1963. Together they recorded two further albums for Elektra, Koerner and Ray each recorded a solo album, also for Elektra, and the three supported one another in touring. Glover wrote one of the first instructional books on how to play blues harmonica.

The trio appeared at the Newport Folk Festival, where their performance was recorded for the Vanguard Records album Newport Folk Festival 1964: Evening Concerts III and filmed for the documentary Festival!, released in 1967.

They played frequently in Dinkytown, where they met Bob Dylan on his first visit to the Ten O'Clock Scholar club, influencing him and others such as Bonnie Raitt. In the late 1960s they often played at the Triangle Bar in the West Bank area of Minneapolis, a popular hangout for bikers and hippies.

In later years they occasionally performed together, until Ray's death in 2002. Koerner and Glover continued to occasionally perform as a duo until Glover's death on May 29, 2019.

Awards
In 1983 the Minnesota Music Academy named Koerner, Ray and Glover "Best Folk Group" and in 1985 inducted them into the MMA Hall of Fame.

In 2008, Koerner, Ray & Glover were inducted into the Minnesota Blues Hall of Fame under the category Blues Recordings for Blues, Rags and Hollers.

Koerner, Ray & Glover has been honored with a star on the outside mural of the Minneapolis nightclub First Avenue, recognizing performers that have played sold-out shows or have otherwise demonstrated a major contribution to the culture at the iconic venue. Receiving a star "might be the most prestigious public honor an artist can receive in Minneapolis," according to journalist Steve Marsh.

Discography
1963: Blues, Rags and Hollers
1964: Lots More Blues, Rags and Hollers
1965: The Return of Koerner, Ray & Glover
1972: Good Old Koerner, Ray & Glover
1996: One Foot in the Groove

References

External links
 Illustrated Koerner, Ray & Glover discography
 Spider John Koerner Official web site

American blues musical groups
Elektra Records artists
Blues revival musicians
Musical groups from the Twin Cities